Mart Dayne McChesney (January 27, 1954 – January 14, 1999) was an American film and television actor known for his appearances in Star Trek: The Next Generation as the tar creature Armus in the 1988 episode "Skin of Evil", and as Sheliak in the 1989 episode "The Ensigns of Command". McChesney was born in Abilene, Texas. For his appearances he wore heavy prosthetics and costumes. Footage of his appearance as Armus was re-used in the Star Trek: TNG second-season episode "Shades of Gray" (1989). McChesney also appeared as Pete 'Maniac' Krizaniac in the horror film, Girls Nite Out (1982).

McChesney died from complications of AIDS in Los Angeles, California in 1999. He was 44 years old.

References

External links

1954 births
1999 deaths
American male film actors
American male television actors
20th-century American male actors